XR or Xr may refer to:

Science and technology

Computing
 IOS XR, Cisco router software 
 Cairo (graphics) library, original name
 Extended reality, VR and AR

Vehicles
 XR, Ford Australia cars
 Honda XR series motorcycles

Other uses in science and technology
 Extended release medication
 OpenXR, VR standard
 iPhone XR, a smartphone released in 2018

Other uses
 XR (character), a character in the animated TV series Buzz Lightyear of Star Command
 Exchange rate, rate at which one currency will be exchanged for another
 Extinction Rebellion, environmental movement and advocacy group
 Extrapolated Runs, a baseball statistic
 Corendon Airlines Europe, IATA airline code 
 The abbreviation ΧΡ (chi-rho), a symbol for Christ